"Heartache All Over the World" is an upbeat song by English musician Elton John from his 20th studio album, Leather Jackets (1986). Written by John and Bernie Taupin, it was released as the album's lead single in September 1986, charting at number 45 in the UK Singles Chart and at number 55 on the US Billboard Hot 100, and reaching the top 10 in Australia, where it peaked at number 7.

The song talks about not being able to date for a night. In 2001, Elton John regarded "Heartache All Over the World" as the worst song he had ever recorded, calling it "pretty insubstantial".

John performed the song four times during his Tour De Force tour in Australia in 1986, which is notable for John's problems with his vocal cords during that time.

Reception
Billboard said that the lyrics are "of the 'lonely teenager' school" and the overdubs are "out of the Spector handbook."  Cash Box said it has a "a perky groove" after a "high-tech/rap intro."

Release 
"Heartache All Over the World" reached number 45 in the UK Singles Chart and stayed on the chart for four weeks, number 55 on the US Billboard Hot 100 and number 58 in Canada, making this song one of the worst-charting singles in John's career.

However, the song found better success in Belgium (No. 26), Ireland (No. 24), New Zealand (No. 22) and notably Australia, peaking at number 7.

Music video 
The music video, directed by Mike Brady, features John and his band playing the song in a stage-like background. It also includes clips from mid-1940s movies and some historical events.

Chart performance

Weekly charts

Year-end charts

Personnel 
 Elton John – vocals
 Charlie Morgan – drums
 Davey Johnstone – guitars, backing vocals
 Fred Mandel – Prophet 2000, Roland P60 and programming
 Gus Dudgeon – electronic percussion
 Graham Dickson – electronic percussion
 Vicky Brown, Alan Carvell, Gordon Neville – backing vocals

References 

1986 songs
1986 singles
Elton John songs
Songs with music by Elton John
Songs with lyrics by Bernie Taupin
Song recordings produced by Gus Dudgeon
Geffen Records singles
The Rocket Record Company singles